The Sloughhouse AVA is an American Viticultural Area located in Sacramento County, California. It is in the northeast part of the larger Lodi AVA. Sloughhouse has the warmest climate in the Lodi region. Sloughhouse is considered by some to be a transitional climate and terrain between the characteristics of the wine regions of the Central Valley and the nearby Sierra Foothills AVA.

References

American Viticultural Areas of California
Geography of Sacramento County, California
American Viticultural Areas
2006 establishments in California